Meredith Peruzzi (born ) is an American historian and Director of the National Deaf Life Museum (NDLM) in Washington D. C.

Early life and education
Peruzzi grew up in Columbia, Maryland and attended Wilde Lake High School where she was the captain of the quiz team. She has a B.A. in Deaf Studies with a minor in History from Gallaudet University (2011) where she  was on a team which took first place in the National Association of the Deaf College Bowl in 2008. Her honors project at Gallaudet was a book called Gallaudet at 150: Chapter One, covering campus history from 1857 to 1880. After college she spent a year in Tokyo teaching American Sign Language. She received her M.A. in history from George Mason University in 2018, with concentrations in U.S. History and Applied History. She is pursuing doctoral work at the University of Leicester, in the field of Museum, Gallery, and Heritage Practice. Her current doctoral research "applies Critical Disability Theory to the issue of deaf visitors developing a sense of belonging in museum spaces."

Career
Peruzzi is a  public historian with research interests that lie in the area of nineteenth- and twentieth-century American Deaf history.
Her first work in museums was in 1991 volunteering for the Baltimore City Life Museums. She started working at the National Deaf Life Museum, which sees approximately 8,000 visitors each year, in June 2013 and became the director in January 2014.

Her museum interests lie in making museums more Deaf-friendly, particularly in the areas of music- and sound-themed exhibits. She also wants museums to alter their relationship with tech-based accessibility, engaging in dialogue with disabled people so that museums can go beyond basic ADA compliance when providing exhibits, displays and interactive opportunities. Under her leadership the museum changed its name from the Gallaudet University Museum to the National Deaf Life Museum, showcasing the history of the Deaf community as well as Gallaudet. She created and curated an exhibit at NDLM about Gallaudet history entitled Gallaudet at 150 and Beyond.

External links
 Personal website

References

Living people
Deaf culture in the United States
Gallaudet University
American women curators
American curators
Year of birth missing (living people)